Karl Werner (born 21 July 1966) is a German former professional footballer who played as a defender.

References

External links
 

1966 births
Living people
German footballers
Association football defenders
Bundesliga players
2. Bundesliga players
Fortuna Düsseldorf players
SpVgg Bayreuth players
FC St. Pauli players
SV Eintracht Trier 05 players